Martin Mate was the Anglican Bishop of Eastern Newfoundland and Labrador in Canada from 1980 to 1992.

Born on 12 November 1929, he was educated at the Memorial University of Newfoundland and ordained in  1953. as a curate at the Cathedral of St John the Baptist, St John's, Newfoundland. He held incumbencies at Pushthrough, St. Barbe, Cookshire, Catalina, Bonavista Bay and Pouch Cove before his ordination to the episcopate

Notes

1929 births
Memorial University of Newfoundland alumni
Anglican bishops of Eastern Newfoundland and Labrador
20th-century Anglican Church of Canada bishops
Living people